"Na-NaNa-Na" is a 2005 single by Nelly from his album Sweat. It features Jazze Pha. The song peaked at number 65 on the Billboard Hot R&B/Hip-Hop Songs chart. The music video for the song shows Nelly on the streets with people surrounding him as he walks back and forth in front of the camera, much like the video for "Country Grammar".

Charts

Release history

References

External links

2005 singles
Nelly songs
Songs written by Nelly
Universal Records singles
Song recordings produced by Jazze Pha
2004 songs
Songs written by Jazze Pha
Songs written by Jasper Cameron